Vickie M. Moseley (born March 6, 1956) was an American politician.

Born in Mattoon, Illinois, Moseley received her bachelor's degree in political science from Blackburn College in Carlinville, Illinois. She lived in Springfield, Illinois with her husband and family. Moseley served in the Illinois House of Representatives from 1993 to 1995 and was a Democrat.

Notes

1956 births
Living people
People from Mattoon, Illinois
Politicians from Springfield, Illinois
Blackburn College (Illinois) alumni
Women state legislators in Illinois
Members of the Illinois House of Representatives
21st-century American women